Tuwaba ibn Salama al-Judhami was Umayyad governor of al-Andalus from August 745 until October 746. He was succeeded by Abd al-Rahman ibn Kathir al-Lakhmi.

See also
Timeline of the Muslim presence in the Iberian peninsula

References

8th-century rulers in Europe
Umayyad governors of Al-Andalus
8th-century Arabs
Banu Judham